KJAA (1240 AM) is a radio station in Globe, Arizona, United States, airing an oldies format. The station is owned by veteran radio personality and talk show host Rollye James and her husband Jon Cornell, through licensee Globecasting, Inc.

History

1240 was home to two previous licenses. The first, KWJB/KZOW, operated from 1938 to 1960, when the impending revocation of the licenses of all stations owned by Gila Broadcasting forced the chain to shut down. The second, KWJB/KPPR, operated between 1969 and approximately 1978.

In 1978, James Mace, who had owned the second KWJB before selling it in 1975, made an application to rebuild 1240 on a new license after KPPR's demise. The application was granted in 1980, and Mace selected the KGJM calls.

External links
FCC History Cards for KJAA

Mass media in Gila County, Arizona
Oldies radio stations in the United States
JAA